Jahan Tigh or Jahantigh may refer to:
 Jahan Tigh, Golestan
 Jahan Tigh, Hirmand, Sistan and Baluchestan Province